The following table lists the names of Welsh communities which have concluded town twinning agreements with communities in Brittany:

See also 
Irish and Breton twin towns

External links
www.kembre-breizh.org.uk
Cymdeithas Cymru Llydaw  

Communes in Brittany
Towns in Wales
Wales
Twin towns
Twin towns